Khawaja Naim Murad, better known as "Naim" or "Nayeem", (born 8th May 1970) is a Bangladeshi film actor, film producer and television director. He is referred to as “ Notun projonmer ogrudud” meaning pioneer of the new generation by the media in recognition of his role in ushering in a new age of youth actors in Bangladeshi cinema in the 1990s. Naim made his acting debut alongside his wife, then-co-star film actress Sabreena Taniya Shabnaz Naim, popularly known as Shabnaz, in Ehtesham's "Chandni" 1991 (The Moon Ray). He acted over 21 films with the actress Shabnaz. Naim’s first leading role in Chandni was a massive success making him an overnight sensation.

Following his success, Naim starred in 8 consecutive box office hits:  Dil, Soniya, Zid, Love, Onutopto, Sakkat, Takar Ohonkar all of which starred actress Shabnaz, making them the generation's most sought-after duo “Naim-Shabnaz”

Family
Naim was born in Dhaka, Bangladesh on May 8th, 1970, to Khawaja Murad and Asiya Panni Murad. Naim is the direct descendant of Dhaka Nawab family. Naim's father was the grandson of Nawab Sir Khwaja Salimullah and son of Nawabzada Khawaja Hafizullah. On the other hand, Naim's mother is Mehedi Ali Khan Panni's daughter and the granddaughter of Haider Ali Khan Panni, brother of Wajed Ali Khan Panni (Chand Mia) of the Koratia, Tangail Zamidar Panni family. Naim has one younger sister Zeba Murad who is a writer and photographer. Pop singer Sabah Tani is his maternal first cousin.  

In the year 1994, October 5th Naim married his co star actress Shabnaz in a traditional Muslim wedding ceremony after a two year courtship. They have two daughters- Nameera Naim and Mahdiyah Naim.

Early life 
When asked about his childhood, Naim mentioned he was always surrounded by art and music. He began playing tabla at the age of five. He has fond memories of hearing his father play the flute as a child, which sparked his love in music. In his teenage years he learned to play the guitar from the famous late guitarist and vocalist Niloy and Sheikh Ishtiaque. At the age of 16 Naim appeared alongside his sister Zeba Murad in the BTV music video " Cholo na Jai chole," which was sang by Shubro Dev and Sabah Tani. Following his popularity of the music video, he appeared in television commercials for Bata shoes and Sunsilk shampoo.

Filmography

References

Living people
20th-century Bangladeshi male actors
Bangladeshi male film actors
Place of birth missing (living people)
Date of birth missing (living people)
1970 births